Vacatio legis is a technical term in law which designates the period between the announcement of a legislation and its entering into force.

This concept also exists in the Catholic canon law.

Civil law 
In civil law, the vacatio legis is "a period of time between announcement of the legal act and its moment of entry into force". It is also known as "an adaptive period", "an accommodative period", "a temporary or transition stage", "a period of rest" or jokingly as "a legal act's holiday". The period of vacatio legis "begins in the moment, when the legal act is officially announced. That kind of regulation as legal act must have a proper announcement, which means that it must be published in official state journal".

Catholic canon law

In the canon law of the Latin Church, the vacatio legis is three months for universal laws, and one month for particular laws, unless the law itself establishes a longer or shorter period of time. Months are reckoned according to the calendar from the date of publication. The law can stipulate a longer or shorter time of vacatio than that which is stipulated generally.

Stanislaus Woywod says of vacatio legis:

See also 
Coming into force
 Sunset provision

References

Bibliography
Della Rocca, Fernando: "Manual of Canon Law" (Milwaukee: The Bruce Publishing Company, 1959).
Flanery, Austin, O.P. (General Editor): The Vatican Collection "Vatican Council II: Volume 1: The Conciliar and Post Conciliar Documents" (New Revised Edition).
Woywod, Rev. Stanislaus, O.F.M. The New Canon Law: A Commentary and Summary of the New Code of Canon Law; New Edition, Augmented by Recent Decrees and Declarations (New York: Joseph F. Wagner Inc., 1918). Full text at "Internet Archive". 

Latin legal terminology
Jurisprudence of Catholic canon law
Civil law (legal system)
Promulgation
Catholic Church legal terminology